Sphagnum girgensohnii, also known as Girgensohn's bogmoss, Girgensohn's sphagnum or common green peat moss, is a species of peat moss with a Holarctic and Indo-Malesian distribution.

References

External links
Sphagnum girgensohnii @ Moss Flora of China

Flora of Bulgaria
girgensohnii